Carl Magnus von Hell (8 September 1849 – 11 December 1926) was the German chemist who discovered, together with Jacob Volhard and the Russian chemist Nikolay Zelinsky, the Hell–Volhard–Zelinsky halogenation reaction.

Life
He studied chemistry at the Technical University of Stuttgart with
Hermann von Fehling and at the University of Munich with Emil Erlenmeyer. After serving in the Franco-Prussian war in 1870 he became assistant professor, and after the death of Fehling in 1883, professor for chemistry at the Technical University of Stuttgart. He supervised the building of the new laboratory which was finished in 1895/96. His research interests have been dicarboxylic acids, aliphatic hydrocarbons and their synthesis. He synthesized the C60H122 showing that carbon chains of up to 60 atoms are possible.
Due to an eye illness he asked for retirement in 1914.

References

1849 births
1926 deaths
20th-century German chemists
19th-century German chemists
Scientists from Stuttgart